William Edward Adams (June 16, 1939 – May 25, 1971) was a major in the United States Army who was posthumously awarded the Medal of Honor for his actions during the Vietnam War.

On May 25, 1971, Adams volunteered to fly a helicopter to rescue three wounded Americans encircled in a fort in Kontum Province. He did this knowing full well that the clear weather allowed North Vietnamese anti-aircraft gunners to easily see their targets. His aircraft was bombarded by anti-aircraft fire, but Adams still persevered and rescued the three men. As he was leaving, his aircraft was shot down, and Adams was killed. He was awarded the Medal of Honor posthumously in 1972.

Early life
Adams was born in Casper, Wyoming. He attended Wentworth Military Academy in Lexington, Missouri, where he graduated in the junior college Class of 1959. Three years later, Adams graduated from Colorado State University as a member of the Class of 1962.

Military career
Adams joined the United States Army in Kansas City, Missouri, in 1962. He began his tour in Vietnam on July 6, 1970. On May 25, 1971, Adams, a major, volunteered to fly a lightly armed helicopter mission to rescue three dead US advisors and a wounded crew chief from a previously shot down helicopter crew chief from a besieged firebase in Kontum Province, despite the clear weather which would provide the numerous enemy anti-aircraft around the location with clear visibility. Despite fire from machine gun emplacements and rockets, Adams succeeded in landing at the firebase while supporting helicopter gunships attacked the enemy positions. After take off, however, the helicopter was hit by fire. Adams momentarily regained control and attempted to land, however the helicopter exploded in mid air and crashed. Adams, who was 31 at the time, was killed.

Adams is buried at Fort Logan National Cemetery in Denver, Colorado. His grave can be found in plot P O, Grave 3831.

Memorials
The Vietnam War Memorial formerly on the campus of Wentworth Military Academy, is the same make and model helicopter that Adams was flying when he was killed.  He is listed on the Vietnam Veterans Memorial on panel 03W, row 054.

Medal of Honor citation

See also

List of Medal of Honor recipients for the Vietnam War
 See a photograph of Maj Adams Headstone

Notes

References

1939 births
1971 deaths
Wentworth Military Academy and College alumni
Colorado State University alumni
United States Army Medal of Honor recipients
American military personnel killed in the Vietnam War
United States Army officers
Vietnam War recipients of the Medal of Honor
United States Army aviators
United States Army personnel of the Vietnam War
Burials at Fort Logan National Cemetery